Sankoch is a 1976 Indian Hindi-language drama film, produced by R. K. Soral on Suyog Films banner and directed by Anil Ganguly. Starring Jeetendra, Sulakshana Pandit  and music composed by Kalyanji–Anandji. The movie is based on the novel Parineeta by Sarat Chandra Chattopadhyay.

Plot
Navin Babu (Om Shivpuri) & Gurucharan (A.K.Hangal) are neighbors. Though Gurucharan already had a large family to support on a meager salary, he did not hesitate to bring home his orphan niece, Lalita (Sulakshana Pandit) probably because a lower-middle-class man has an incredible capacity to share hunger. Before long Lalita endeared everyone including the rich neighbor Navin Babu's wife and especially their young son Shekar (Jeetendra) and she moved their house as freely as the west wind. Both Shekar and Lalita grew up together but always behaved like young kids. Under the pressure of family needs, Gurucharan had mortgaged his living house to Navin Babu. Being greedy, Navin Babu of late had an evil design to grab the house. In this of the hour of distress, it was Girish, brother of Lalita's friend Aruna, who come to their rescue. Thus, in the household of Gurucharan, the girl was looked upon as an angel. He was helping Gurucharan to select a suitable match for Lalita. Shekhar grew suspicious and jealous of Girish. Lalita had merged in Shekar's life. The thought and pang of separation from Lalita were unbearable for him. There was a small function in Gurucharan's house celebration of Munni's doll's marriage. On this occasion on Shekar's terrace, something happened. Lalita in playful mood garlanded Shekar, in turn, Shekar and garlanded her which solemnized their marriage. However, both knew of the very many hurdles in their path and were enveloped in hesitation. They kept the marriage incident a secret

In the absence of Shekhar and his mother, on a trivial incident, Navin Babu and Gurucharan quarried, for Lalita, the miseries mounted because Gurucharan was negotiating a proposal for her marriage. The quarrel between Navin Babu and Gurucharan proved to have a sickening effect on both. On Girish's insistence, Gurucharan came to Goa for change. Lalita had to accompany them. It was unfortunate that soon after, Navin Babu and Gurucharan come to the end of their lives journey. In the dying moments, Gurucharan extracted a promise from Girish that he would marry Lalita To Lalita it was an impossibility. She felt with her a married woman and something more a wife in exile. In those hours of the grim test, her only moral support was the garland which had united her with Shekar. But, the promise made with the last breath of Gurucharan had to be respected by one and all. The Wedding invitation of Lalita and Girish reacted to Shekar. To his Insisting mother, he gave consent to marry another girl whom his last father had selected. After that, Lalita, Suman, and Girish came to attend Shekar's marriage. At the meeting between Shekar, Lalita, and Girish, Shekhar misbehaved but Girish was cast in a different mold. To poor Lalita in this selfish world, the dried garland was the only source of consolation. Circumstances had conspired against her. She hid in the corner of the terrace where she had accepted Shekhar as a husband. In that hour it looked as tear-soaked garland mocked on her was it a tryst with destiny? Girish told Shekhar that Lalita told him everything and married Vidya not Lalita. Shekhar asks forgiveness from Lalita and he tells his mother about their marriage.

Cast

Jeetendra as Shekar
Sulakshana Pandit as Lalita
Vikram Makandar as Girish
A.K. Hangal as Guru Charan
Om Shivpuri as Naveen Babu
I. S. Johar as Sangeet Samrat 
Ramesh Deo as Avinash 
Jankidas as Vidyavathi's father 
Keshto Mukherjee as Dhakkan
Urmila Bhatt as Gurucharan's wife 
Aruna Irani as Sangeet Samrat's wife
Seema Deo as Avinash's wife 
Dulari as Naveen Babu's wife
Preeti Ganguly as Vidyavathi
Lalitha Kumari as Vidyavathi's mother

Soundtrack

References

Films scored by Kalyanji Anandji
Films directed by Anil Ganguly